Recharge or Recharged may refer to:
Groundwater recharge, a hydrologic process where water moves to groundwater
Recharge (battery), the process to restore power or charge to a power storage device, such as a battery
Recharge (magazine), is a business news website and monthly magazine covering the global renewable energy industry
Surface water recharge, a hydrologic process where water runs off to surface watercourses
Volvo Recharge, a plug-in concept car developed by Volvo

Music
Recharged (album), 2013 remix album by Linkin Park
Recharged, 1988 studio album by The Vibrators

Other
Ricochet Lost Worlds: Recharged, video game